From May 18–21, 2013, a significant tornado outbreak took place across parts of the Midwestern United States and lower Great Plains. This event occurred just days after a deadly outbreak struck Texas and surrounding southern states on May 15. On May 16, a slow moving trough crossed the Rockies and traversed the western Great Plains. Initially, activity was limited to scattered severe storms; however, by May 18, the threat for organized severe thunderstorms and tornadoes greatly increased. A few tornadoes touched down that day in Kansas and Nebraska, including an EF4 tornado near Rozel, Kansas. Maintaining its slow eastward movement, the system produced another round of severe weather nearby. Activity significantly increased on May 19, with tornadoes confirmed in Oklahoma, Kansas, Iowa, Missouri, and Illinois. In Oklahoma, two strong tornadoes, one rated EF4, caused significant damage in rural areas of the eastern Oklahoma City metropolitan area; two people lost their lives in Shawnee. The most dramatic events unfolded on May 20 as a large EF5 tornado devastated parts of Moore, Oklahoma, with 24 people being killed. Thousands of structures were destroyed, with many being completely flattened. Several other tornadoes occurred during the day in areas further eastward, though the majority were weak and caused little damage.

The severe threat shifted towards damaging straight-line winds on May 21 as a large squall line developed across the southern states. Further north in Ontario, three tornadoes, including one that was rated EF2, touched down. Over the following five days, the system responsible for the outbreak moved very little across the Eastern United States. By May 24, it virtually stalled off the coast of New England, resulting in several days of heavy rain across the region. It later moved northeastward and was last noted by the Weather Prediction Center late on May 26 over southeastern Canada. During the storm's eleven-day trek across the United States, it produced 75 tornadoes, 4 of which were rated EF3 or higher. Over 1,000 reports of damaging winds were received by the Storm Prediction Center as well. The system's slow movement also resulted in record-breaking rains in North Dakota, New York, and Vermont. Additionally, during the overnight of May 25 – 26, unusually cold air behind the cyclone resulting in record-late snows across northern New England.

Confirmed tornadoes

May 18 event

May 19 event

May 20 event

May 21 event

See also
Tornadoes of 2013
Tornado outbreak of May 18–21, 2013
List of tornadoes in the tornado outbreak of May 26–31, 2013

Notes

References

2013 natural disasters in the United States
Tornadoes of 2013
Tornadoes in the United States
May 2013 events in the United States